Deerslayer is a 1943 American Western film. It is based on the 1841 novel The Deerslayer by James Fenimore Cooper. It stars Bruce Kellogg and Jean Parker, and was directed by Lew Landers.

Plot

Cast
 Jean Parker as Judith Hutter
 Bruce Kellogg as Deerslayer
 Larry Parks as Jingo-Good
 Yvonne De Carlo as Wah-Tah
 Warren Ashe as Harry March
 Wanda McKay as Hetty

Production
The film was the first, and only, film written and produced by film reviewer P. S. Harrison, founder of the film journal Harrison's Reports.

Filming began in June 1943.

It was the first notable film role for Yvonne De Carlo who was borrowed from Paramount Studios. "She later wrote, "There have been several movie versions of The Deerslayer and this was probably the least memorable, but at the time I was thrilled to be in it."

Reception
Variety opined, "Harrison draws a complete blank as a producer-scenarist."

Harrison's publication Harrison's Reports published their first review acknowledged not to have been written by Harrison. It was written by Abram F. Myers.

References

External links
Deerslayer at TCMDB
The Deerslayer at IMDb
The Deerslayer at BFI

1943 films
1943 Western (genre) films
American Western (genre) films
Films directed by Lew Landers
American black-and-white films
Films based on works by James Fenimore Cooper
Films set in the 1740s
1940s American films